The 2018–19 Copa Catalunya is the 30th staging of the Copa Catalunya. The competition began on 28 July 2018 and will be played by teams in Segunda División, Segunda División B, Tercera División and the top teams of Primera Catalana.

Qualified teams
The following teams compete in the 2018–19 Copa Catalunya.

3 teams of 2017–18 Segunda División

Barcelona B
Gimnàstic
Reus

7 teams of 2017–18 Segunda División B

Badalona
Cornellà
Llagostera
Lleida Esportiu
Olot
Peralada
Sabadell

18 teams of 2017–18 Tercera División

Ascó
Castelldefels
Cerdanyola
Espanyol B
Europa
Figueres
Gavà
Granollers
Horta
L'Hospitalet
Palamós
Prat
Sant Andreu
Santboià
Santfeliuenc
Terrassa
Vilafranca
Vilassar de Mar

3 teams of 2017–18 Primera Catalana

FE Grama
San Cristóbal
Sants

Tournament

First round
Matches were played on 28 and 29 July 2018.

Second round
Matches were played between 4 and 12 August 2018.

Third round
Matches were played on 11 August 2018.

Bye: Granollers

Fourth round
Matches were played on 7 November 2018. One of the teams qualified from the third round received a bye and goes straight to the semifinals. In this round, the Segunda División teams, Barcelona B, Gimnàstic and Reus, enter the competition.

Bye: Gimnàstic

Semifinals
Matches will be played on 21 November 2018.

Final

References

External links
Tournament matches at FutbolCatalunya 

Cata
Copa Catalunya seasons
Copa